Lentil As Anything Inc. (Lentil) was a group of pay as you feel, not for profit vegetarian and vegan Australian restaurants founded by Shanaka Fernando. Restaurants were located in Melbourne and Sydney and operated on a similar model to pay what you can. The operation closed in February 2022 due to financial concerns and allegations of mismanagement. Lentil is named after the Australian new wave band Mental As Anything.

History
Lentil is a multicultural, refugee-friendly, organisation founded in September 2000 and is registered with the Australian Charities and Not-for-profits Commission. There were four Lentil locations, the first of which opened in 2000 in St. Kilda and the largest being located at the former Abbotsford Convent. The most recent restaurant opened in the Melbourne suburb of Thornbury in 2015, and seven other locations have opened and later closed in the group's history.

Dining experience
Live music, world music, films, and artworks were often performed and displayed at the restaurants, particularly at Abbotsford and Thornbury, where the restaurants became public meeting places with many patrons travelling from the north and east. It notably catered for the Green New Deal Conference in Melbourne in 2009.

Pay what you feel model
The restaurants wholly relied on the generosity of their patrons, volunteers and suppliers to operate. Patrons were asked to "pay what they feel" the meal, service and beverages are worth by contributing an amount of their choice into a box at the counter. The Abbotsford and St. Kilda locations initially faced large financial debt due to mismanagement and other factors, many of which were later resolved.

In 2016, it was reported that its Newtown restaurant was operating at a loss as the average patron payment was less than $3.

Also in 2016, the Abbotsford restaurant introduced a number of changes to prevent freeloading such as no BYO alcohol and asking people to move on if they spent an unreasonable amount of time at the restaurant.

In the media
In 2010, The Naked Lentil, a documentary on the restaurant and its founder Shanaka Fernando was aired by SBS. Fernando (with Greg Hill) published the book Lentil as Anything: Everybody Deserves a Place at the Table in 2012.

See also
 Give-away shop
 List of vegetarian restaurants
 Retail
 Pay what you want

References

External links
Official website
SBS documentary "The Naked Lentil"

Restaurants in Victoria (Australia)
Restaurants in New South Wales
Vegetarian restaurants in Australia
Defunct restaurants in Australia
Defunct vegetarian restaurants
2000 establishments in Australia
2022 disestablishments in Australia
Restaurants established in 2000